Gorham Vance "Dixie" Leverett (March 29, 1894 – February 20, 1957) was a pitcher in Major League Baseball. He played for the Chicago White Sox and Boston Braves.

References

External links

1894 births
1957 deaths
Major League Baseball pitchers
Chicago White Sox players
Boston Braves players
Baseball players from Texas
People from Georgetown, Texas
Nashville Vols players